Aaron Frobel (born December 13, 1986) is a Canadian professional wrestler and promoter, better known by his ring name Michael Elgin. He most recently worked for Pro Wrestling Noah, where he was a one-time GHC Tag Team Champion with Masa Kitamiya. He is best known for his work with New Japan Pro-Wrestling (NJPW), where he is a former NEVER Openweight Champion. In NJPW, he was also a one-time IWGP Intercontinental and a one-time NEVER Openweight 6-Man Tag Team Champion. He is also known for his work in Ring of Honor (ROH), where he is a one-time ROH World Champion. He has also worked for the Southern California-based company Pro Wrestling Guerrilla, where he is a one-time PWG World Tag Team Champion with Brian Cage.

Frobel debuted in late 2004 using his ring name Michael Elgin, and by the age of 16, he was a regular on the independent circuit. He has competed for promotions including Combat Zone Wrestling, World League Wrestling, Alpha-1 Wrestling, and the Independent Wrestling Association Mid-South, where he won the IWA Mid-South Strong Style Championship in 2008. Elgin first appeared for Ring of Honor in 2007. He started competing regularly in 2010 as part of the House of Truth and signed a contract with the company in 2011. That November, Elgin won the 2011 Survival of the Fittest tournament. In 2015, Elgin won the 2015 Survival of the Fittest tournament and became the first wrestler to win the tournament twice. In 2015, Elgin made his debut for NJPW, signing a contract with the promotion the following year. After three years with the promotion, Elgin left New Japan Pro-Wrestling in March 2019 and signed with Impact Wrestling the following month.

Professional wrestling career

Training and early career 
Frobel had begun training at a wrestling school at the age of 14. He later moved to training at Squared Circle Training in Toronto, Ontario, Canada under Rob Fuego in early 2004.

In late 2004, Frobel made his professional wrestling debut in Hamtramck, Michigan using the ring name Michael Elgin. By the age of 16, Frobel, as Elgin, was a regular competitor on the independent circuit. The Ontario Athletic Commission did not allow people under the age of 18 to wrestle professionally in the area, so Frobel travelled to Montreal, as well as to the United States to wrestle in the states of Michigan, Ohio, and Indiana.

Independent promotions (2005–2010) 
Frobel, as Elgin, has been a mainstay in several independent promotions, both in the United States and Canada, since 2005.

He has wrestled for the Pure Wrestling Association since 2005. That same year, he made two appearances for Empire State Wrestling, and a third in 2009. He made a single appearance for Ultimate Championship Wrestling on November 12, 2005, losing to Alcatraz. He also made a single appearance for World League Wrestling, wrestling at an October 19, 2008 show in a tag team match. In 2011, Elgin appeared at a CRW show, losing a triple threat match to Jake Matthews.

Elgin made two appearances for Combat Zone Wrestling; he defeated Jay Fenix at Night of Infamy 5 in 2006 and teamed with Andrew Sullivan to defeat Cory Kastle and Danny Pagan at Down With The Sickness 4Ever in 2008. In 2009, he competed in Independent Wrestling Association: Deep South's Southern Classic Invitational tournament, making it to the three-way final, where he lost to Chrisjen Hayme.

Elgin debuted for Independent Wrestling Association Mid-South (IWA Mid-South) in September 2006, at Lethal Lottery 2006, when he and Jason Dukes lost to Ian Rotten and Vito Thomaselli. His next IWA Mid-South appearance was in February 2007, when he and Ashley Sixx lost to Blackout (Joker and Sabian). Elgin and Ash continued to team together throughout early 2007, losing to team including The Iron Saints, and Southern Rock (Hillbilly Jed and Indiana Kidd, Jr.) before earning their first win against The Naptown Dragons (Die Hard and Vortekz) at April Bloodshowers 2007. The team of Elgin and Sixx named themselves "Pretty Unreal" and continued to feud with various members of The Naptown Dragons faction, winning several tag team matches against them. At Summer Scorcher in June, The Pretty Unreals suffered their first loss to The Naptown Dragons, when they were defeated by Die Hard and Vortekz in a Tables, Ladders and Chairs match. After a hiatus, Elgin returned to IWA Mid-South in October as a singles wrestler, wrestling against Drake Younger, Roderick Strong, Eddie Kingston, and 2 Cold Scorpio.

On March 1, 2008, Elgin defeated Strong, Younger, and Viking in a four-way match to win the vacant IWA Mid-South Strong Style Championship. He successfully defended the championship in a three-way match against Tank and Toby Klein at April Bloodshowers 2008, against CJ Otis at Extreme Intentions, against Jimmy Clough at Gory Days 4 in July, and against Bobby Fish the following month at Put Up or Shut Up 2008, before losing the championship to Nick Gage at We are Family 2 on August 17, ending a six-month reign. In September, Elgin was a competitor in the 2008 Ted Petty Invitational, where he defeated Ricochet in the first round, before losing to Younger in the quarter-finals.

On March 9, 2009, Elgin unsuccessfully challenged Dingo for the IWA Mid-South Heavyweight Championship at 2009 King of the Death Matches Night One. Throughout 2009, Elgin formed a semi-regular tag team with Sami Callihan, and the pair faced teams including Da Soul Touchaz and The Michigan Militia of Jeff Brooks and Brian Skyline.

Elgin also competes for Alpha-1 Wrestling, where he won the Alpha-1 Wrestling Zero Gravity Championship. He competed for Stranglehold Wrestling in 2007. He was a competitor in the first annual Dewey "Missing Link" Robertson Memorial Tournament in December, making it to the semi-finals before losing to GT Dynamite.

Frobel attended a World Wrestling Entertainment (WWE) tryout camp in mid-2010.

Blood, Sweat and Ears and Maximum Pro Wrestling (2005–2006, 2009–2011) 

At BSE Pro's inaugural show in 2005, Elgin appeared as part of a six-man tag team match. In December of that year, Elgin was part of a suicide six-pack match won by El Sombra. Canadian Online Explorer writer Bob Kapur called Elgin "the breakout performer" of the match due to his in-ring abilities and reactions to the crowd. He feuded with Ashley Sixx in late 2005 and early 2006, losing to him on multiple occasions. In May 2006, Elgin teamed with Anton Arakis in a tag team loss to Trent Powers and Phil Atlas at a Blood, Sweat and Ears show. He continued to lose throughout 2006 to wrestlers including Kobra Kai and Tarantula Gomez, failing to win a match in the promotion.

After a three-year hiatus, Elgin returned to the promotion, now called BSE Pro, in a loss to Josh Taylor on August 16, 2009. At the following show, Devil's Night 2009 in October, Elgin earned his first victory for the promotion by defeating Big Bang Pete. He then formed a regular tag team with Ashley Sixx and the duo faced off against Assault and Battery (Mike Alias and Kenneth Crises) to win the BSE Tag Team Championship on November 7. The held the championship for two weeks, before dropping it to The All Starters in a three-way cage match also involving Assault and Battery.

In 2010, BSE Pro merged with Border City Wrestling to form Maximum Pro Wrestling, and Elgin began competing for the new promotion. On March 20, Elgin and Sixx lost to Manabu Soya and Jon Bolen. In May 2010, he and Sixx defeated Black Serpent and Kobra Kai in a tag team match.

At Return To The Arctic Day 1 in May 2011, Elgin unsuccessfully challenged Tyson Dux for the MaxPro Triple Crown Championship. On September 10, 2011, Elgin defeated Matt Cross. Two weeks later, Elgin lost to Crazy Steve.

Great Canadian Wrestling (2006–2010) 

At Reach for the Gold on April 13, 2006, Elgin won a ladder match to win the GCW National Championship, and become the inaugural champion. He held the championship for just over a month, before dropping it to TJ Wilson in a triple threat match, also involving Shark Boy, at Battleground Zero. At the Super Hardcore Anime Wrestling Expo in May 2006, Elgin won a triple threat match by defeating Wilson and Johnny Devine. Also at the Expo, Elgin regained the GCW National Championship, when he and Mike Stevens defeated Wilson and Devine in a tag team match with the championship on the line. At Breaking Point on August 10, Devine defeated Elgin for the championship in a Lumberjack match; however, Devine was ruled to have won via disqualification and therefore Elgin retained the championship. On September 15, Devine defeated Elgin in a cage match to win the championship.

On November 18, 2006, Elgin filled in for the injured GCW Ontario Independent Champion Jake O'Reilly in a title defense against Hayden Avery, but lost the match, making Avery the new champion. Elgin and O'Reilly then formed a regular tag team, and on December 28, at Season's Beatings, they defeated the Lunatics (Crazzy Steve and Gutter) to win the GCW Tag Team Championship. On January 12, 2007, O'Reilly attacked Elgin, ending their partnership and causing the GCW Tag Team Championship to be vacated. Two months later, at Ugandan Invasion Elgin teamed with Havok (formerly Johnny Devine) to defeat O'Reilly and Joe Doering in a match for the vacant championship. Derek Wylde replaced Havok as the co-champion and Elgin's tag team partner during the reign, after accepting Elgin's offer to team up on April 13. The following night, Elgin and Wylde were defeated by O'Reilly and Crazzy Steve in a match for the championship, but the decision was reversed and Elgin and Wylde retained the championship. At Beyond the Limit in July, Elgin was injured prior to a title defense, so Andrew Davis substituted for him in the match. Wylde and Davis lost the match and the GCW Tag Team Championship to Avery and Cody Deaner. Also in 2007, Elgin was GCW's storyline CEO and was involved in a feud with former CEO Jamie Virtue. On December 27, 2010, Elgin defeated Mike Rollins in his final GCW match.

Ring of Honor (2007, 2008, 2010–2016) 
Frobel had his first tryout match with Ring of Honor (ROH) in 2007. At The Battle Of St. Paul on April 27, 2007, Elgin faced Rhett Titus in a singles match that ended in a no contest when Jimmy Rave attacked both men. Immediately afterward, Rave defeated Elgin in a singles match. Almost a year later, Elgin returned to ROH on April 18, 2008, at Tag Wars 2008, where he, Danny Daniels, and Michael Nakazawa were defeated in a six-man tag team match by Pelle Primeau, Mitch Franklin, and Ernie Osiris.

Elgin's next appearance came at Survival of the Fittest 2010 in November 2010, when he made his main roster debut as part of the House of Truth faction led by Truth Martini. As part of his debut, the House of Truth (Elgin, Roderick Strong and Zach Gowen), faced and lost to the Briscoe Brothers (Jay and Mark) and Christopher Daniels. The following night at Fate of an Angel II, Elgin and Gowen lost to the team of Bobby Dempsey and Grizzly Redwood. After the match, Elgin attacked Gowen until Dempsey and Redwood stopped him. Elgin's next appearance was at World's Greatest on February 25, 2011, where he lost to Christopher Daniels. At the 9th Anniversary Show internet pay-per-view the next night, Elgin lost to El Generico. He then interfered in Strong's match against Homicide, helping Strong to retain his ROH World Championship. At Defy or Deny in March, Elgin lost to Eddie Edwards, and at the following show, Manhattan Mayhem IV, Elgin and Mike Mondo lost to Adam Cole and Kyle O'Reilly, causing Elgin to attack Mondo. Frobel signed a contract with ROH on March 19, 2011, tying him to the company through December 2012.

Elgin appeared at both days of the Honor Takes Center Stage pay-per-view, defeating Generico on night one, before losing to Daniels on night two. At Best in the World 2011 in July, Elgin defeated Steve Corino. Elgin appeared at the Ring of Honor Wrestling television tapings on August 13, losing to Edwards in a rematch from Defy or Deny. The match aired on television in October. At Tag Team Turmoil 2011, Elgin and Strong lost to The American Wolves of Davey Richards and Edwards. Elgin then appeared at the Death Before Dishonor IX pay-per-view in September, where he lost to Charlie Haas. At the television tapings in October, Elgin and Strong lost a rematch to The American Wolves, which aired in November.

On November 18, Elgin won the 2011 Survival of the Fittest tournament. He won a four-corner survival match against Kenny King, Adam Cole, and Tommaso Ciampa to advance to the tournament final, a six-man elimination match, in which he last eliminated Kyle O'Reilly to win the tournament and a guaranteed ROH World Championship match. At the Showdown in the Sun pay-per-view on March 31, 2012, Elgin unsuccessfully challenged Davey Richards for the ROH World Championship. The match was later given a five-star rating by Dave Meltzer of the Wrestling Observer Newsletter. Elgin later defeated fellow break-out star Adam Cole at Border Wars, in his hometown of Toronto. On July 20, ROH announced that Elgin had signed a long-term contract extension with the promotion. After months of teasing dissension between Elgin and the rest of the House of Truth, Elgin finally turned on the faction on September 16 at Death Before Dishonor X: State of Emergency by attacking Roderick Strong. At the following internet pay-per-view, Glory By Honor XI: The Unbreakable Hope on October 13, Elgin unsuccessfully challenged Kevin Steen for the ROH World Championship. After the match, Elgin was attacked by Roderick Strong. The attack led to a match on December 16 at Final Battle 2012: Doomsday, where Elgin was defeated by Strong, following interference from Truth Martini. On March 2, 2013, at the 11th Anniversary Show, Elgin defeated Strong in a two out of three falls match, during which Martini was banned from ringside. On April 6, at Supercard of Honor VII, Elgin defeated Jay Lethal to become the number one contender to the ROH World Championship. Before Elgin got his title shot however, the ROH World Championship was vacated and he was entered in the tournament to determine the new champion. In August, Elgin defeated Paul London and Karl Anderson to advance to the semifinals of the tournament. The following month, at Death Before Dishonor XI, Elgin defeated Kevin Steen to make it to the finals of the tournament, where he was defeated by Adam Cole. On October 26 at Glory By Honor XII, Elgin earned himself another shot at the ROH World Championship by pinning Cole to win a four-on-four elimination tag team match between ROH's champions and their top contenders. Elgin received his title shot on December 14 at Final Battle 2013, but was defeated by Cole in a three-way match, which also included Jay Briscoe. In May 2014, Elgin took part in a tour co-produced by ROH and New Japan Pro-Wrestling (NJPW). On May 17 at War of the Worlds, Elgin unsuccessfully challenged A.J. Styles for NJPW's top title, the IWGP Heavyweight Championship, in a three-way match, which also included Kazuchika Okada.

Elgin continued to feud with Adam Cole over the ROH World Championship; the storyline saw Cole attack Elgin and cut off his hair, before expanding to include Elgin's real-life wife MsChif, who Cole also attacked. On June 22 at Best in the World 2014, Elgin defeated Cole to become the new ROH World Champion. Elgin would go on to defend the title seven times before losing it to Jay Briscoe on September 6 at All Star Extravaganza 6, ending his reign as ROH World Champion at 76 days. The following day it was reported that behind the scenes Elgin had not only fallen out of favor with ROH management, but was for the moment also unable to get out of Canada due to a work visa issue.

On October 6, ROH announced that Elgin was returning to the promotion the following weekend. However, just hours later, Elgin quit the promotion on Twitter, claiming that ROH had promoted him for an event he was not going to appear at. Elgin returned to ROH as a villain with a new, disgruntled character on October 25, first walking out on an interview with Kevin Kelly and then refusing to wrestle Caprice Coleman. On November 7, 2015, it was reported that Elgin had signed a new deal with ROH. In November 2015, Elgin participated in the 2015 Survival of the Fittest tournament, which he won after pinning Jay Briscoe in the finals. Elgin became the first wrestler to win the tournament twice. On December 15, 2016, Elgin announced that outside of joint shows with NJPW, he would no longer be working for ROH.

Pro Wrestling Guerrilla (2012–2017) 

On May 25, 2012, Elgin made his debut for Pro Wrestling Guerrilla, losing to Willie Mack. On July 21 at Threemendous III, PWG's nine-year anniversary event, Elgin defeated Sami Callihan for his first win in the promotion. On September 1, Elgin entered the 2012 Battle of Los Angeles, defeating Davey Richards in his opening round match. The following day, Elgin first defeated Brian Cage in the quarterfinal round, then Ricochet in the semifinal, before losing to Adam Cole in the final round of the tournament. On October 27 at Failure to Communicate, Elgin unsuccessfully challenged Kevin Steen for the PWG World Championship in a three-way match, which also included Ricochet.

On January 12, 2013, Elgin and Brian Cage formed a tag team called the Unbreakable F'n Machines (a name derived from both wrestlers' nicknames) and participated in the 2013 Dynamite Duumvirate Tag Team Title Tournament. In the opening round, they captured the PWG World Tag Team Championship by beating the previous year's winners, the Super Smash Bros. (Player Uno and Stupefied). The Unbreakable F'n Machines then lost the championship to The Young Bucks (Matt and Nick Jackson) in the semifinal round of the tournament later that same day. On August 30, Elgin entered the 2013 Battle of Los Angeles, defeating Rich Swann in his first round match. The following day, Elgin first defeated Roderick Strong and then Johnny Gargano to advance to the finals of the tournament, where he was defeated by Kyle O'Reilly.

New Japan Pro-Wrestling (2015–2019)

Gaining popularity and Intercontinental Champion (2015–2016) 
Through ROH's working relationship with NJPW, Elgin made his debut for the Japanese promotion by taking part in the 2015 G1 Climax between July 23 and August 15. He finished his tournament with a record of four wins and five losses, failing to advance from his block. Elgin quickly became popular among Japanese crowds and his performance in the tournament was called a "career resurgence". In November, it was announced he would team with Hiroshi Tanahashi in the 2015 World Tag League. They finished the tournament with a record of four wins and two losses, narrowly missing the finals due to losing to block winners Togi Makabe and Tomoaki Honma in the head-to-head match.

On January 4, 2016, at Wrestle Kingdom 10 in Tokyo Dome, Elgin unsuccessfully challenged Jay Lethal for the ROH World Championship. On February 20, it was reported that Elgin had signed a two-year deal with NJPW. This was confirmed by NJPW on March 3. In his first tour under a NJPW contract, Elgin made it to the semifinals of the 2016 New Japan Cup, before losing to Hirooki Goto. On March 20, Elgin received his first title shot in NJPW, when he, Hiroshi Tanahashi and Juice Robinson unsuccessfully challenged The Elite (Kenny Omega and The Young Bucks) for the NEVER Openweight 6-Man Tag Team Championship.

On April 10 at Invasion Attack 2016, Elgin won his first title in NJPW, when he, Tanahashi and Yoshitatsu defeated The Elite to become the new NEVER Openweight 6-Man Tag Team Champions. They made their first successful defense on April 23 against Bad Luck Fale, Kenny Omega and Yujiro Takahashi. Four days later, Elgin unsuccessfully challenged Omega for the IWGP Intercontinental Championship. This marked the first time two Canadians had main evented a NJPW show. On May 3 at Wrestling Dontaku 2016, Elgin, Tanahashi and Yoshitatsu lost the NEVER Openweight 6-Man Tag Team Championship back to The Elite.

On June 19 at Dominion 6.19 in Osaka-jo Hall, Elgin replaced an injured Hiroshi Tanahashi and defeated Kenny Omega in NJPW's first ever ladder match to become the new IWGP Intercontinental Champion. From July 22 to August 13, Elgin took part in the 2016 G1 Climax, where he finished with a record of five wins and four losses. Elgin failed to advance to the finals due to losing to Katsuhiko Nakajima on the final day. On September 25 at Destruction in Kobe, Elgin lost the IWGP Intercontinental Championship to Tetsuya Naito. On October 10 at King of Pro-Wrestling, Elgin suffered a broken left eye socket taking a dropkick from Naito. The injury would require surgery and forced Elgin to pull out of all future events, including a scheduled IWGP Intercontinental Championship rematch with Naito at Power Struggle.

Teaming with Jeff Cobb and NEVER Openweight Champion (2017–2019) 
Elgin returned to NJPW on January 4, 2017, at Wrestle Kingdom 11 in Tokyo Dome, winning the pre-show New Japan Rumble after entering as the first man in. On February 11 at The New Beginning in Osaka, Elgin unsuccessfully challenged Tetsuya Naito for the IWGP Intercontinental Championship. After being sidelined from NJPW due to the size of the promotion's roster, Elgin returned on June 11 at Dominion 6.11 in Osaka-jo Hall, losing to Cody. On July 1 at G1 Special in USA, Elgin took part in a tournament to determine the inaugural IWGP United States Heavyweight Champion, but was eliminated in his first round match by Kenny Omega. Later that month, Elgin entered the 2017 G1 Climax. Despite a win over 2016 G1 Climax winner and reigning IWGP United States Heavyweight Champion Kenny Omega, Elgin finished second to last in his block with a record of four wins and five losses. Due to his win over Minoru Suzuki in the tournament, Elgin was granted a shot at the NEVER Openweight Championship on September 10 at Destruction in Fukushima, but was defeated by Suzuki in a lumberjack deathmatch.

At the end of the year, Elgin teamed with the debuting Jeff Cobb in the 2017 World Tag League. The two did not get along behind the scenes with Elgin making disparaging remarks about his tag team partner in private messages that were made public while the tournament was still in progress. They finished the tournament with a record of four wins and three losses, failing to advance to the finals. At New Japan's Dominion 6.9 in Osaka-jo Hall show, Elgin faced and defeated Taichi and Hirooki Goto to win the NEVER Openweight Championship for the first time. On June 17, 2018 at Kizuna Road, Elgin lost the NEVER openweight title back to Goto in his first defence of the title.

Elgin participated in the 2019 New Japan Cup, losing in the first round to Okada. The tour surrounding the tournament featured Elgin's final match with the promotion on March 24, 2019, teaming with Colt Cabana and Toa Henare to defeat Tencozy and Shota Umino. On April 1, Elgin officially parted ways with NJPW.

Mexico (2016–2018) 
On June 1, 2016, the Mexican Consejo Mundial de Lucha Libre (CMLL) promotion announced Elgin as a participant in the 2016 International Gran Prix. On June 23, 2016, Elgin made his debut in Lucha Libre Elite defeating Jinder Mahal. On June 25, 2016, Elgin also became Lucha Libre Elite's inaugural World Champion by defeating Volador Jr. in a tournament final. On July 1, Elgin took part in the 2016 International Gran Prix, from which he was eliminated by Último Guerrero. On July 10, Elgin was defeated by Último Guerrero in Arena México. Elgin's Mexican tour concluded the following day.

On July 26, 2017, CMLL announced Elgin as a participant in the 2017 International Gran Prix. He started the CMLL tour on August 22. On September 1, Elgin was the last man eliminated from the 2017 International Gran Prix by Diamante Azul. Elgin's Mexican tour concluded the following day. On October 5, Elgin eliminate Último Guerrero winning the 2018 International Gran Prix.

On November 3, 2018, in The Crash Lucha Libre Elgin participated in a Fatal 4-Way by The Crash Heavyweight Championship against Willie Mack, Bárbaro Cavernario and El Mesías in which he was defeated by Mack in the 7th anniversary of The Crash.

Impact Wrestling (2019–2020)

Elgin debuted at Impact Wrestling's Impact Wrestling Rebellion show, confronting Brian Cage moments after Cage became the new Impact World Champion and attacked him afterwards. On the May 3 episode of Impact Wrestling, Elgin defeated Johnny Impact and Pentagón Jr. in a triple threat to determine the number one contender for the Impact World Championship. On the May 17 episode of Impact Wrestling, Elgin lost to Rich Swann by disqualification when Elgin beat down Swann outside of the ring. On June 7, at the Slammiversary XVII event, Elgin faced Cage for the Impact World Championship, but lost the match. Elgin would attack Cage after their match, only to be speared by a returning Rhino. At Bound for Glory 2019, Elgin defeated Naomichi Marufuji. At Hard To Kill, Elgin lost to Eddie Edwards. On June 22, 2020, it was announced that Elgin was suspended by Impact following sexual assault allegations that were made public as part of the Speaking Out movement.  On June 26, Impact Wrestling announced Elgin would be removed from all future programing and his contract would be terminated.

Pro Wrestling Noah (2019–2022)
Elgin made his Pro Wrestling NOAH debut on November 2, 2019 in Battle of Aesthetics facing Takashi Sugiura for the newly created GHC National Championship, in which he lost. Elgin returned on January 4, 2020 during the Korakuen Hall tour, facing Katsuhiko Nakajima in a winning effort, and facing Masao Inoue in a winning effort the following day.

On May 21, 2022, Elgin teamed with Masa Kitamiya defeating Sugiura-gun International (El Hijo de Dr. Wagner Jr. and René Duprée) to win the GHC Tag Team Championships.

Following his July 9, 2022 arrest, Elgin was stripped of his GHC Tag Team Championship and removed from future Noah shows.

Personal life 
Frobel lived in Oshawa, Ontario, Canada, but has since moved to Toronto, Ontario, Canada. Frobel previously worked in construction, but required too many days off for his wrestling appearances, forcing him to quit.

In June 2013, Frobel announced his engagement to fellow professional wrestler Rachel Collins, better known under her ring name as MsChif. They wed the following month on July 4. On September 4, 2015, Collins gave birth to her and Frobel's first child, a boy named Jax. The couple divorced in 2020.

In July 2021, Frobel was arrested for violating a protection order filed by his ex-fiance.

Championships and accomplishments 
Absolute Intense Wrestling
AIW Absolute Championship (1 time)
Jim Lynam Memorial Tournament (2017)
J.T. Lightning Invitational Tournament (2014)
All American Wrestling
AAW Heavyweight Championship (1 time)
AAW Heritage Championship (1 time)
AAW Tag Team Championship (1 time) – with Ethan Page
Fourth AAW Triple Crown Champion
Alpha-1 Wrestling
A1 Zero Gravity Championship (1 time)
BSE Pro
BSE Tag Team Championship (1 time) – with Ashley Sixx
Canadian Wrestling Revolution
CWR Canadian Junior Heavyweight Championship (1 time)
CWR World Heavyweight Championship (1 time)
Consejo Mundial de Lucha Libre
CMLL International Gran Prix (2018)
Dynamo Pro Wrestling
Dynamo Pro D-1 Championship (1 time)
GALLI Lucha Libre
GALLI Gladiatores Championship (1 time)
Glory Pro
Glory Tag Team Championship (1 time) – with Everett Connors
Great Canadian Wrestling
GCW National Championship (2 times)
GCW Tag Team Championship (4 times) – with Jake O'Reilly (1), Havok (1), Derek Wylde (1) and Ashley Sixx (1)
Independent Wrestling Association Mid-South
IWA Mid-South Heavyweight Championship (2 times)
IWA Mid-South Strong Style Championship (1 time)
Revolution Strong Style Tournament (2014)
Lucha Libre Elite
Elite World Championship (2016)
New Japan Pro-Wrestling
IWGP Intercontinental Championship (1 time)
NEVER Openweight Championship (1 time)
NEVER Openweight 6-Man Tag Team Championship (1 time) – with Hiroshi Tanahashi and Yoshitatsu
New Japan Rumble (2017)
New School Wrestling
NSW Heavyweight Championship (2 times)
NSW Tag Team Championship (1 time) – with Mike Stevens
Pro Wrestling Eclipse
PWE Open Weight Championship (1 time)
Canada Cup (2011)
Pro Wrestling Guerrilla
PWG World Tag Team Championship (1 time) – with Brian Cage
Pro Wrestling Illustrated
Ranked No. 14 of the top 500 singles wrestlers in the PWI 500 in 2014
Pro Wrestling Noah
GHC Tag Team Championship (1 time) – with Masa Kitamiya
Pro Wrestling Phoenix
PWP Heavyweight Championship (1 time)
Pro Wrestling Xtreme
PWX Pro Division Championship (2 times)
PWX Bar Championship (1 time)
Qatar Pro Wrestling
QPW Middle East Championship (1 time)
Ring of Honor
ROH World Championship (1 time)
Survival of the Fittest (2011, 2015)
Xtreme Intense Championship Wrestling
XICW  United States Championship (1 time)

Notes 
 Elgin initially won the championship with Havok, but Derek Wylde replaced Havok as Elgin's tag team partner and co-champion during the reign.

References

External links 

 
 
 
 

1986 births
21st-century professional wrestlers
Canadian male professional wrestlers
Expatriate professional wrestlers in Japan
Living people
Professional wrestlers from Ontario
Sportspeople from Oshawa
ROH World Champions
IWGP Intercontinental champions
NEVER Openweight champions
NEVER Openweight 6-Man Tag Team Champions
PWG World Tag Team Champions
GHC Tag Team Champions
AAW Heavyweight Champions
AAW Heritage Champions
AAW Tag Team Champions